The Brazen Bull is a 2011 American thriller/horror released on July 13, 2011. It was written, directed, and produced by Douglas Elford-Argent. It stars Jennifer Tisdale as the main role and Michael Madsen as the killer. It was released on DVD on September 2, 2011.

Plot

Cast
 Jennifer Tisdale as Lauren Vinyec
 Michael Madsen as The Man
 Gwendolyn Garver as Ashley
 David Frank Fletcher Jr. as Tyler
 Rachel Hunter as Natasha Vinyec
 Nills Allen Stewart as Detective Miller
 Anastasia McPherson as Lilly
 Shannon Kingston as Lisa Klein (Amelia Kingston)
 Elissa Dowling as Lola
 Christian Madsen as Billy
 Marek Motousek as Homeless Person
 Tom Riles as The Photographer
 Steve Shaheen as Paramedic

Critical reception
Head of Virgil Productions said, "Its very much your typical revenge story taken to a more sinister blood spraying level. Madsens character of the absolute Psycho takes me back to his Reservoir Dogs days. The movie has its moment, Rachel Hunters performance could have used a bit more work, accent was slipping in and out from American to Kiwi. Loved the level of gore, The fact its all filmed in one location makes it an easy watch and keeps your attention. Michael Madsen continues to impress me with his awesome roles, I'll never stop admiring his work."

Production companies
 30 Something Productions
 Libra-Con Productions
 Luckster Productions

References

External links

 

2011 horror thriller films
2011 films
American horror thriller films
2011 horror films
2010s serial killer films
2010s English-language films
2010s American films